Maria Alves (7 November 1947 – 8 May 2008), was a Brazilian actress.

Television 
 1970 - "Irmãos Coragem" - Salete
 1979 - "Plantão de Polícia" - Odete
 1979 - "Marron Glacê" - Bizuca
 1981 - "Baila Comigo" - Conceição - for this work she received the Golden Support Award from Artur da Távola
 1982 - "Lampião e Maria Bonita" - Mabel
 1982 - "Sol de Verão" - Matilde
 1983 - "Voltei pra você" - Paciência
 1984 - "Vereda Tropical" - Namorada de Bepe
 1985 - "Tenda dos Milagres" (mini-series)
 1985 - "O Tempo e o Vento" (mini-series)
 1986 - "Selva de Pedra" - Maria
 1987 - "Mandala" - Carmem
 1989 - "Kananga do Japão" (Rede Manchete) - Isaura
 1990 - "Rosa dos Rumos" (Rede Manchete) - Maurina
 1991 - "Na rede de intrigas" (Rede Manchete)
 1991 - "Felicidade" - Maria
 1994 - "A Viagem" - Francisca
 1995 - "História de Amor" - Nazaré
 1996 - "Xica da Silva" (Rede Manchete) - Rosa
 1997 - "Por Amor" - Maria
 1998 - "A Turma do Pererê" (TVE Brasil/TV Cultura)
 1999 - "Louca Paixão" (Rede Record) - Iracema Rangel
 2001 - "As filhas da mãe" - Jussara
 2006 - "Um Menino Muito Maluquinho" (TV Cultura) - Marinês

Films 
 1964 - Lana, Rainha das Amazonas
 1975 - A Extorsão
 1976 - Perdida - nominated for Best Supporting Actress by the  Associação Paulista de Críticos de Arte
 1977 - Gente Fina É Outra Coisa
 1977 - O Jogo da Vida
 1978 - Coronel Delmiro Gouveia
 1978 - O Cortiço
 1978 - Se Segura, Malandro! .... Marilu
 1979 - Gargalhada Final
 1979 - O Bom Burguês
 1981 - A Mulher Sensual
 1981 - O Sequestro
 1984 - Noites do Sertão
 1984 - Para Viver um Grande Amor
 1985 - Fonte da Saudade
 1987 - La Via dura
 1987 - Romance da Empregada
 1991 - A Grande Arte
 1991 - Dèmoni 3
 1991 - Vai Trabalhar, Vagabundo II
 1995 - Sombras de Julho
 1996 - O Lado Certo da Vida Errada
 1999 - Mauá - O Imperador e o Rei
 2001 - Elisa - short film which she directed, wrote and acted
 2002 - Ator Profissão Amor - Directed, wrote and acted. This film was selected for the BR 2003 Festival and to be exhibited at the Bibliothèque nationale de France at the France / Brazil 2005 event
 2006 - Sólo Dios Sabe

Theatre 

 Gota d'Água (musical)
 Ópera do Malandro (musical)

References

External links 
 
 Adoro Cinema Brasileiro

People from Sergipe
1947 births
Brazilian actresses
2008 deaths